Benjamin Naka-Hasebe Kingsley is an Indigenous American writer and poet. Benjamin belongs to the Onondaga Nation. He is most recognized for his collections: Colonize Me (Saturnalia, 2019) and Not Your Mama’s Melting Pot (Backwaters Press, 2018). He has also released another collection, Dēmos: An American Multitude (Milkweed Editions, 2021).

Education 
Kingsley got his Masters of Fine Arts (MFA) from the University of Pennsylvania.

Colonize Me 
Colonize Me is Kingsley's second poetry collection. The poems in the collection are often based on his real experiences. The collection won an Eric Hoffer Award.

Dēmos: An American Multitude 
Dēmos: An American Multitude was released on March 7, 2021. The collection features poems relating to Onondaga, Japanese, Cuban and Appalachian cultures.

Career 
From 2019 until at least October 21st, 2020, Kingsley worked as an Assistant Professor of English in the College of Arts and Letters at Old Dominion University.

Personal life 
Kingsley grew up in Indiana, Pennsylvania. His parents were both factory workers at a True Temper wheelbarrow factory.

In August 2017, during the time which he was writing Dēmos, Kingsley claims that he was assaulted by a police officer in Harrisburg, Pennsylvania. According to Kingsley, he was maced by a police officer without reason on the street at night. He then stumbled into oncoming traffic, before going to a local pizza shop, where patrons helped clear his eyes with water.

Awards 

 2020 Winner of the Library of Virginia Literary Award
 2019 Howard Frank Mosher Short Fiction Prize
 Fellowship from Fine Arts Work Center in Provincetown
 2017 VONA/Voices of Our Nation
 2017–2019 Gilman School Tickner Writing Fellow

References

Native American poets
Onondaga people
Living people
Year of birth missing (living people)
People from Indiana, Pennsylvania
University of Pennsylvania alumni
21st-century American poets